Libby Hill is a village in the city of Gardiner, Maine, United States. It is located near the intersection of US Highway 201 and Interstate 295 in western Gardiner. It is the home of the city of Gardiner's Libby Hill Business Park.

References

Gardiner, Maine
Villages in Kennebec County, Maine